Fisholme is a small area in the East Riding of Yorkshire, England that is situated between Brigham and Emmotland. The canal section of the Driffield Navigation leaves Frodingham Beck at this point.

Location
0.7 miles south-east of Brigham on the Holderness Plain.

Situated on the Driffield Navigation
Next point upstream = Brigham
Next point downstream = Emmotland
Next point upstream on Frodingham Beck = Frodingham Landing

History
There is a moat shown on the OS of the area, and a building called Fisholme Barn used by the Manor Farm, Brigham.

See also
Driffield Navigation

Geography of the East Riding of Yorkshire